Browning Township is one of twelve townships in Franklin County, Illinois, USA. At the 2010 census, its population was 2,450 and it contained 1,184 housing units.

Geography

Cities, towns, villages
 Benton (west quarter)
 Buckner
 Christopher (east edge)
 Valier (east quarter)
 West City

Unincorporated towns
 Valier Patch
 Rend City

Extinct towns
 Hickory Corners

Cemeteries
The township contains eleven cemeteries. These are Browning, Grammer, Harrison, Hickory Corners, Knight, Moser, Mount Pleasant, Saint Joseph, Saint Marys, Smith and Wayman.

Major highways
  Interstate 57
  Illinois Route 14

Airports and landing strips
 Benton Municipal Airport

Landmarks
 Benton City Park

Demographics

School districts
 Christopher Community Unit School District 99
 Sesser-Valier Community Unit School District 196

Political districts
 Illinois' 12th congressional district
 State House District 117
 State Senate District 59

References
 
 United States Census Bureau 2007 TIGER/Line Shapefiles
 United States National Atlas

External links
 City-Data.com
 Illinois State Archives

Townships in Franklin County, Illinois
Townships in Illinois